(Disambiguation page for other titles -- The Doctor's Secret)

The Doctor's Secret is a 1913 silent film short directed by and starring Van Dyke Brooke with Norma Talmadge and Leo Delaney. It was produced by the Vitagraph Company of America and released by the General Film Company.

This film is lost.

Cast
Van Dyke Brooke - Dr. Von Metz
Norma Talmadge - Elsa
Leo Delaney - 
William Shea -
Charles Kent - Dr. Bergmann
Frank Mason -
Helene Costello - Elsa, as a child
Charles Slaten -

References

External links

lobby poster(archived)

1913 films
American silent short films
American black-and-white films
Films directed by Van Dyke Brooke
1913 lost films
Silent American drama films
Lost American films
1913 drama films
Lost drama films
1910s American films